Bansal Institute of Science and Technology (BIST) is a private-public institution established in 2000, situated in Bhopal. It is affiliated to Rajiv Gandhi Technical University, Bhopal and approved to AICTE, New Delhi.
The Institute runs several UG and PG Courses related to Engineering, MCA and MBA. The courses are approved by AICTE, New Delhi and Affiliated to Rajeev Gandhi Technical University and Barkatullah University (MBA ONLY)  Bhopal. It is a part of Bansal Group.

Bansal Group Of Institutes

 Bansal College of Pharmacy, Bhopal.
 Bansal Institute of Science & Technology, Bhopal
 Bansal Institute of Research & Technology, Bhopal.
 Bansal Institute of Research Technology & Science, Bhopal.
 Bansal College of Engineering, Mandideep.
 Sushila Devi Bansal College of Engineering, Indore.
 Sushila Devi Bansal College of Technology, Indore.

References 

Education in Bhopal
Jain universities and colleges